The 2015 Dudley Hewitt Cup was the 44th Central Canadian Jr A Ice Hockey Championship for the Canadian Junior Hockey League. The Winner of the 2015 Dudley Hewitt Cup will represent the central region in the 2015 Royal Bank Cup in Portage la Prairie, Manitoba.

Teams
Fort Frances Lakers (Host and SIJHL Champions)
Regular Season:
Playoffs: Defeated Thunder Bay North Stars 4-1, Defeated Dryden Ice Dogs 4-2 to win the league

Dryden Ice Dogs (SIJHL Runner-up)
Regular Season: 30-21-5 (3rd in SIJHL)
Playoffs: Defeated Minnesota Iron Rangers 4-2, Defeated by Fort Frances Lakers 2-4.

Toronto Patriots (OJHL Champions)
Regular Season: 35-18-0-1 (1st in OJHL South Division)
Playoffs: Defeated St. Michael's Buzzers 4-0, Defeated Oakville Blades 4-1, Defeated Toronto Jr. Canadiens 4-2, Defeated Kingston Voyageurs 4-3 to win the league.

Soo Thunderbirds (NOJHL Champions)
Regular Season:38–11–2–1 (1st in NOJHL West Division)
Playoffs: Defeated Blind River Beavers 4-0, Defeated Elliot Lake Wildcats 4-1, Defeated Cochrane Crunch 4-1 to win the league.

Tournament

Standing

Round Robin

Semifinal and final

References
https://pointstreak.com/prostats/scoreboard.html?leagueid=255&seasonid=13835
http://pointstreaksites.com/view/ojhl
https://nojhl.com/
https://sijhlhockey.com/

2014–15 in Canadian ice hockey